Last Fool Show is a 2019 Filipino romantic comedy film written and directed by Eduardo Roy Jr. with the film producer and current ABS-CBN Corporation president Carlo Katigbak. It was filmed in Boracay island in the Philippines starring Arci Muñoz and JM de Guzman. The film was released in the Philippines on April 10, 2019, and April 18, 2019, in the United Arab Emirates.

Plot
Arci Muñoz as Mayessa is a filmmaker who has experienced success in the indie film industry. The movie starts with her pitching an indie film concept to a major mainstream movie company and galaxy films. However, the Galaxy Films executive Bibeth Orteza as Tess was presenting to insisted that she let go of the indie concept for now and think of a movie idea that would be a hit with the masses something in the line of romcom. But she needed money to help her cancer stricken mother Snooky Serna as Sonya. Isa decides to do a rom com based on her own failed love story with him

Cast
 Arci Muñoz as Mayessa Dominguez
 JM de Guzman as Paolo
 Snooky Serna as Sonya
 Bibeth Orteza as Tess Ranido
 Arlene Muhlach as Julie
 Gina Alajar as Joanna Lee
 Menggie Cobarrubias as Mr. Estrella
 Josef Elizalde as Fonzy
 Cholo Barretto as Hobi
 Patrick Sugui as himself
 Erin Ocampo as Jane
 Victor Silayan as Rocky
 Kris Tiffany Janson as herself
 Chamyto Aguedan as Oslec
 VJ Mendoza as Erwin
 Via Antonio as Zen
 Alora Sasam as Gema
 Joanna Marie Katanyag as herself

References

External links

Star Cinema films
Philippine romantic comedy films
Filipino-language films
Films directed by Eduardo Roy Jr.